Orchestra Safari Sound (OSS) was a major Tanzanian muziki wa dansi band in the 1970s. Along with Orchestra Maquis Original, OSS contributed to the evolution of dansi, introducing a slower-paced and more melodic style that further differentiated dansi from its ancestor genre, the Congolese soukous. The band was led by Ndala Kasheba, one of the most popular musicians in Tanzanian pop music.

As a difference with respect to most dansi bands, that were mostly managed by government institutions, OSS was the property of an entrepreneur, Hugo Kisima. In 1985, Kisima disbanded OSS to found another successful ensemble, International Orchestra Safari Sound (IOSS).

Numerous music groups have positioned Tanzania on the international map. Indeed, regardless of the currently famed bongo fava, a type of music that has rattled entire sub-Saharan Africa, the post-independence era marked the growth and development of some of the lost famed musical groups in the East African nation. Among the most popular musical groups in post-independence Tanzania, perhaps the international orchestra safari sound (IOSS) was the most popular musical group in the nation. Typically, many music groups in Tanzania and greater east African in the post-independence era were aggressive in their marketing and strategic popularization approaches after emancipation and freedom from the British rule. Unfortunately, such aggressiveness was not usually beneficial since it led to the fragmentation of such music groups; as such, a few of such entities lasted beyond ten years before metamorphosing into disintegrated factions consisting of solo individuals. Hence, the IOSS adopted a similar trend, an aspect that restrained its lifespan from 1985 to 1992.

During its formative years, the IOSS was instrumental in inspiring various musicians that subsequently emerged to fame and steered Tanzania’s music industry to its current standings within the sub-Saharan entertainment industry. For example, research by Rosenberg (2011) illustrates an inextricable link between the music style of the IOSS as well as the current conventional famed trends of bongo fava. Precisely, the inherent need to reflect Tanzania’s culture and typical aspects of daily was an underlying core to the IOSS. Hence, the IOSS established a form and theme that underscored the principles and verbal art of Tanzania, which subsequently propagated to the current generation (Suriano, 2007; Graebner, 2019).  Furthermore, even though the IOSS has initially been a reserved and mainly a conservative faction, it eventually inspired a generation of bongo fava that metamorphosed the Tanzania music to reflect the thriving urban culture and the new generation that had tasted globalization.

References
 Jens Finke, Tanzania, Rough Guides 2003, p. 783.
 
Graebner, W. (2019). The Legacy of Tanzanian Musicians Muhidin Gurumo and Hassan Bitchuka. Rhumba Kiserebuka!
Rosenberg, A. L. (2011). Form and theme as unifying principles in Tanzanian verbal art: elieshi Lema and orchestra ddc Mlimani Park. Wasafiri, 26(1), 40-49.
Suriano, M. (2007). 'Mimi ni msanii, kioo cha jamii'urban youth culture in Tanzania as seen through Bongo Fleva and Hip-Hop.

Tanzanian musical groups